This is a list of 1977 British incumbents.

Government
 Monarch
 Head of State - Elizabeth II, Queen of the United Kingdom (1952–2022)
 Prime Minister
 Head of Government - James Callaghan, Prime Minister of the United Kingdom (1976–1979)
 Chancellor of the Exchequer
 Denis Healey, Chancellor of the Exchequer (1974–1979)
 Secretary of State for Foreign and Commonwealth Affairs
 Anthony Crosland, Secretary of State for Foreign and Commonwealth Affairs (1976–1977)
 David Owen, Secretary of State for Foreign and Commonwealth Affairs (1977–1979)
 Secretary of State for the Home Department
 Merlyn Rees, Secretary of State for the Home Department (1976–1979)
 Secretary of State for Transport
 Bill Rodgers, Secretary of State for Transport (1976–1979)
 Secretary of State for Scotland
 Bruce Millan, Secretary of State for Scotland (1976–1979)
 Secretary of State for Social Services
 David Ennals, Secretary of State for Social Services (1976–1979)
 Secretary of State for Northern Ireland
 Roy Mason, Secretary of State for Northern Ireland (1976–1979)
 Secretary of State for Defence
 Frederick Mulley, Secretary of State for Defence (1976–1979)
 Secretary of State for Industry
 Eric Varley, Secretary of State for Industry (1975–1979)
 Secretary of State for Trade
 Edmund Dell, Secretary of State for Trade (1976–1978)
 Secretary of State for Education and Science
 Shirley Williams, Secretary of State for Education and Science (1976–1979)
 Secretary of State for Wales
 John Morris, Secretary of State for Wales (1974–1979)
 Lord Privy Seal
 Fred Peart, Baron Peart, Lord Privy Seal (1976–1979)
 Leader of the House of Commons
 Michael Foot, Leader of the House of Commons (1976–1979)
 Lord President of the Council
 Michael Foot, Lord President of the Council (1976–1979)
 Lord Chancellor
 Elwyn Jones, Baron Elwyn-Jones, Lord Chancellor (1974–1979)
 Chancellor of the Duchy of Lancaster
 Harold Lever, Chancellor of the Duchy of Lancaster (1974–1979)

Religion
 Archbishop of Canterbury
 Donald Coggan, Archbishop of Canterbury (1974–1980)
 Archbishop of York
 Stuart Blanch, Archbishop of York (1975–1983)

1977
Leaders
British incumbents